Thomas Dean Rathman (born October 7, 1962) is a former professional football player, a fullback for the San Francisco 49ers and Los Angeles Raiders of the National Football League (NFL). Following his playing career, he became a coach in 1995 and coached the 49ers' running backs through the 2016 season and now will be inducted into the 49ers' hall of fame.
Rathman was a three-sport star at Grand Island Senior High in central Nebraska.  In addition to a state Hall of Fame career as a fullback for the Islanders football team, Rathman won a state championship in the high jump in 1980 during his junior year.

College career
Rathman was a three-year letter winner in football at the University of Nebraska. He finished his college career with 1,425 rushing yards, and averaged over six yards per carry. Often considered the greatest fullback in modern Nebraska history, Rathman set several school position records, some of which still stand, including most yards rushing by a fullback in a single season (881, in 1985) and most career rushing touchdowns by a fullback (twelve). He was noted for his ability to break long runs, especially during his senior year in 1985, when he averaged 7.5 yards per carry.

 1983: 26 carries for 143 yards and 0 TD
 1984: 75 carries for 381 yards and 4 TD
 1985: 118 carries for 881 yards and 8 TD

Professional career
Rathman was selected by the 49ers in the third round of the 1986 NFL Draft with the 56th overall pick. His professional career spanned nine years as a fullback, the first eight with the 49ers. For the first five seasons, he was the lead blocker for another former Cornhusker, Roger Craig. Rathman helped lead the 49ers to two Super Bowl championships, rushing for 38 yards, catching four passes for 43 yards, and scoring two touchdowns in Super Bowl XXIV.  In 1989, he led all NFL running backs in receiving with 73 receptions for 616 yards.  Rathman spent his last season in 1994 with the Los Angeles Raiders.

Rathman finished his NFL career with 2,020 rushing yards, 320 receptions for 2,684 yards with a total of 34 touchdowns. Additionally, Rathman had five kickoff returns for 103 yards.

Coaching career
After retiring as a player, Rathman began his coaching career in 1995 at the high school level, as the running backs coach for Junípero Serra High School in San Mateo.  The next year, he served as offensive coordinator at Menlo College in Atherton. He became a pro coach in 1997 when he joined the 49ers staff, and served as running backs coach through 2002.  In 2003, he accompanied head coach Steve Mariucci to the Detroit Lions where Rathman was running backs coach during Mariucci's three seasons with the Lions. He then held the same position for the Oakland Raiders for three seasons, and returned to the 49ers as running backs coach on January 7, 2009. Following the departure of head coach Mike Singletary, Rathman was retained by Jim Harbaugh for the 2011 season and was again retained by Jim Tomsula for the 2015 season. After the firing of Tomsula a year later, Rathman was once again retained by new 49ers head coach Chip Kelly for the 2016 season. Following that season, Rathman was not re-hired after Kyle Shanahan was named head coach for the upcoming season. On February 27, 2018, Rathman was hired as the running backs coach for the Indianapolis Colts. On January 28, 2021, the Colts announced Rathman had retired.

Personal life
Rathman currently resides in Redwood Shores, California with his wife Holly, and three daughters, Nicole, Ali, and Samantha.

References

External links
 Indianapolis Colts profile
 

1962 births
Living people
American football fullbacks
Detroit Lions coaches
Indianapolis Colts coaches
Los Angeles Raiders players
Menlo Oaks football coaches
Nebraska Cornhuskers football players
Oakland Raiders coaches
San Francisco 49ers coaches
San Francisco 49ers players
High school football coaches in California
People from Grand Island, Nebraska
Players of American football from Nebraska